Mārtiņš Karsums (born 26 February 1986) is a Latvian professional ice hockey right winger currently playing for MHk 32 Liptovský Mikuláš of the Slovak Extraliga. 

Karsums was selected in the second round, 64th overall, in the 2004 NHL Entry Draft by the Boston Bruins. He has played in the National Hockey League for the Bruins and the Tampa Bay Lightning.

Playing career

Early career
Karsums first appeared on scouts' radar with his appearances at the Division I U18 and 2003 World Junior Ice Hockey Championship tournaments in 2003, representing Latvia. Karsums scored twice in the U18 tournament and showed another side of his game in the 2003 World Junior Ice Hockey Championship event when he tallied 35 PIM in just five games.

North America

Junior league
Unhappy with his limited play at the Latvian club team Vilki Rīga, Karsums elected to transfer to the Moncton Wildcats of the QMJHL. He enjoyed a very good rookie season for the Moncton Wildcats, finishing in the top five of both team and league rookie, scoring 53 points (30 goals, 23 assists), and accumulating 76 PIM. Karsums also dominated the 2004 World Junior Ice Hockey Championship Division I tournament, scoring seven goals and adding six assists for 13 points in five games.

Karsums had problems with injury that limited his play with Moncton for the 2004-05 season, but he still managed to be productive. In 30 games, he scored 26 points (14 goals, 12 assists) and had 31 penalty minutes.

During the 2005–06 season, which was his most successful season so far, Karsums scored 65 points (34 goals, 31 assists) and helped his Moncton Wildcats to win the Jean Rougeau Trophy and the President's Cup. He also received the Guy Lafleur Trophy as playoff most valuable player, scoring 27 points (16 goals, 11 assists) in 22 games and was the first European-born player to do so. Eight of his 16 post-season goals have proven game-winning goals, including three of the four game-winners in the championships series vs the Quebec Remparts.

He played in the 2006 Memorial Cup, scored one goal, and had three assists in five games.

Professional leagues
On May 22, 2006, Karsums signed a three-year contract with Boston Bruins. He spent the majority of that time playing for the Providence Bruins of the American Hockey League (AHL), the top farm team of the Bruins. In his most successful 2007/08 season with Providence, Karsums scored 20 goals and had 63 points in 79 games.

On December 13, 2008, Karsums debuted in NHL with the Boston Bruins against Atlanta Thrashers in a 4–2 win. On March 4, 2009, on the NHL Trade Deadline, he was traded by the Bruins, along with Matt Lashoff, to the Tampa Bay Lightning in exchange for Mark Recchi. While playing for the Lightning, Karsums scored his first career NHL goal on April 3, 2009, against the New Jersey Devils' Martin Brodeur.

Return to Europe
On January 14, 2010, after playing the first half of the season with affiliate, the Norfolk Admirals of the AHL, Karsums was reassigned by the Lightning to HC MVD of the Kontinental Hockey League. However, he didn't join the team and was instead loaned to Dinamo Riga.

After struggling in the first season, he became a major contributor and one of the scoring and on-ice leaders in his next three seasons with Dinamo Riga. He played at least 50 games in all three seasons finishing above 30 points. Mid-through 2012–13 season Karsums was named as captain of the team.

After four seasons with Dinamo Rīga, Karsums signed a contract with HC Dynamo Moscow.

Following the 2017–18 season, his fifth with Dynamo, Karsums left the club as a free agent and agreed to a one-year deal to continue in the KHL with HC Spartak Moscow on May 4, 2018.

Karsums played 11 seasons in the KHL before moving to Germany and agreeing to a one-year contract with Krefeld Pinguine of the DEL for the pandemic delayed 2020–21 season on 22 December 2020.

After a lone season with Krefeld, Karsums opted to return for a second stint with Dinamo Riga of the KHL on 8 May 2021.

International play
Karsums debuted internationally at the junior level with Latvia at the 2001 IIHF World U18 Championships. At the Division I 2004 World Junior Championships, Karsums helped Latvia claim the bronze medal, leading the tournament in scoring with 13 points in 7 games. He later claimed the Gold medal and promotion to the top tier at the 2005 World Junior Ice Hockey Championships. (D1-B)

On May 11, 2008, Karsums debuted for Latvia against Norway in a 4–1 win, earning his first career international point, an assist. Since then Karsums has played in three World Championships. He missed 2011, 2012 and 2013 championships due to injuries.
Karsums scored crucial game tying goal against France in 2014 Winter Olympics qualifications 3:2 OT loss, that allowed Latvian national team to qualify for 5th Olympic games, and 4th in a row.

Career statistics

Regular season and playoffs

International

Awards and honours

References

External links 
 
 

1986 births
Living people
Boston Bruins draft picks
Boston Bruins players
Dinamo Riga players
HC Dynamo Moscow players
Ice hockey players at the 2010 Winter Olympics
Ice hockey players at the 2014 Winter Olympics
Ice hockey players at the 2022 Winter Olympics
Krefeld Pinguine players
Latvian ice hockey right wingers
Moncton Wildcats players
Norfolk Admirals players
Olympic ice hockey players of Latvia
Providence Bruins players
HC Spartak Moscow players
Ice hockey people from Riga
Tampa Bay Lightning players
MHk 32 Liptovský Mikuláš players
Latvian expatriate sportspeople in Canada
Latvian expatriate sportspeople in the United States
Latvian expatriate sportspeople in Germany
Latvian expatriate sportspeople in Slovakia
Latvian expatriate sportspeople in Russia
Expatriate ice hockey players in Canada
Expatriate ice hockey players in the United States
Expatriate ice hockey players in Germany
Expatriate ice hockey players in Slovakia
Expatriate ice hockey players in Russia
Latvian expatriate ice hockey people